Tom Hayes (born 16 February 1952) is a former Irish Fine Gael politician who served as a Minister of State from 2013 to 2016. He served as a Teachta Dála (TD) for the Tipperary South constituency from 2001 to 2016. He was a Senator for the Agricultural Panel from 1997 to 2001.

Hayes was educated at Mount Melleray College, Waterford, and Tipperaray Vocational School.

He was elected in 1997 to the 21st Seanad for the Agricultural Panel. He was Fine Gael Seanad Spokesperson on Agriculture. He was elected on 30 June 2001 to the 28th Dáil, as a TD for Tipperary South, when he held the seat for Fine Gael in a by-election following the death of Theresa Ahearn. He was re-elected at the 2002, 2007 and 2011 general elections.

Hayes served as Chairman of the Fine Gael Parliamentary Party from September 2002 to March 2010. He was party deputy Spokesperson on Transport, with responsibility for Road Safety from October 2010 to March 2011.

On 5 June 2013, he was appointed by the Fine Gael–Labour government as Minister of State at the Department of Agriculture, Food and the Marine with responsibility for Forestry, Horticulture, the Greyhound Industry and Food Safety.

He lost his seat at the 2016 general election. He continued in office as a Minister of State until the formation of a new government on 6 May 2016.

References

 

1952 births
Living people
Alumni of University College Cork
Fine Gael TDs
Irish farmers
Local councillors in South Tipperary
Members of the 21st Seanad
Members of the 28th Dáil
Members of the 29th Dáil
Members of the 30th Dáil
Members of the 31st Dáil
Ministers of State of the 31st Dáil
Politicians from County Tipperary
Fine Gael senators